Summercamp is an alternative rock quartet from Santa Barbara, California, United States, where, in 1987, vocalist/guitarists Tim Cullen and Sean McCue met in high school. Another fellow student, bass guitarist Misha Feldmann, joined soon after; and drummer Tony Sevener signed on in 1994, making the line-up complete. With Chris Shaw producing, the band issued its first LP, Pure Juice, in 1997 on Maverick Records.

They charted with the single "Drawer" in the U.S. and "Should I Walk Away" reached the Top 10 in Japan.

Summercamp toured the US, Europe and Japan in support of their release, including the second stage of the 1997 Lollapalooza, the 1997 Pukkelpop, and appearing at the very first Fuji Rock Festival in Japan in 1997. The band also toured with Failure, Poster Children, Tonic and fellow Santa Barbarans, Toad the Wet Sprocket.

After coming off the road in support of Pure Juice, the band started work on a second album that went unfinished and unreleased, as record company issues led to their eventual breakup in 2001. Summercamp reunited in mid-2015 and performed a reunion show on August 8 at Velvet Jones in Santa Barbara.

Summercamp also released a new single called "PeachTree" independently through their bandcamp page on August 28, 2015.

Members
 Tim Cullen (born September 12, 1969) – lead vocals/guitar
 Sean McCue (born March 3, 1969) – lead vocals/guitar
 Misha Feldmann (born December 19, 1970) – bass guitar
 Tony Sevener (born August 21, 1970) – drums
 Ramy Antoun – drums
 Erik Herzog – drums (in Old Man)

Discography

Studio albums
 Old Man (1993) (under the name Old Man)
 Pure Juice (1997)

EPs
 Tonight! (1997)
 Sampler (1997) Maverick Recording Company PRO-CD-8730 U.S.A. A preview of their upcoming album Pure Juice.

Singles
 "Drawer" (1997, Maverick) No. 21 Modern Rock Tracks, No. 37 Mainstream Rock Tracks
 "Should I Walk Away" (1997)
 "PeachTree" (2015)

Old Man

On June 1, 1993, Old Man (effectively the first incarnation of Summercamp, with Sean McCue, Tim Cullen, Misha Feldmann, and Erik Herzog on drums) released a self-titled album, recorded on a TASCAM 38" analog 8-track tape machine at McCue's home in Santa Barbara. Three of the songs on this album ("Should I Walk Away", "The Bright Side" and "Thing of the Past") arreared on Pure Juice four years later. Dean Dinning of Toad the Wet Sprocket plays bass guitar on "Johnny", "Strollin'" and "Time Passes". Under the Summercamp moniker, a different version of the song "Johnny" was released on the 1997 My Records label compilation Happy Meals: A Smorgasbord of My Favorite Songs.

Solo discographies

Tim Cullen

Albums
 Fun Razor (2004)

Singles
 "One More Time Around" (February 2010)
 "Merry Christmas" (December 2010)
 "Face" (January 2011)

Sean McCue

Albums
 Apart (2006)
 Apart - Instrumentals (2006)

Singles and EPs
 "I Never Said" (1999)
 "Peace Is the Word" ("Grease" cover - 2008)
 "Lying in the Shade" (2009)
 "Rescue" (May 2010)
 "Falling for You" (July 2010)
 "Feeling Creative" (August 2010)
 SAF3 EP (August 2010)
 "Home" (April 2015)

Sean & Michelle (Sean McCue and Michelle Beauchesne)

Albums
 Simple Lines (2009)
 After the Fire (May 2012)

Singles
 "Beautiful Day" (U2 cover - November 2010)
 "Blackbird" (Beatles cover - November 2010)
 "You Can Close Your Eyes" (April 2011)

References

External links
 
 Sean McCue's official website
 Tim Cullen's official website
 

Musical groups established in 1997
Musical groups disestablished in 2000
Alternative rock groups from California
1993 debut albums